Hohenkirchen is a municipality in the north of district Nordwestmecklenburg in Mecklenburg-Vorpommern (Germany). It is administered by the Klützer Winkel (Amt) located in the city Klütz.

References